The Poverty Problem in India was a book published in 1895 by Prithwis Chandra Ray that analyzed various factors that were leading India to become increasingly impoverished under British rule. The book was influential and used extensively as a reference in other works and economic analysis in India throughout the twentieth century.

See also
 'Prosperous' British India
 Poverty in India
 British Raj

References
 
 

1895 non-fiction books
Books about India
Poverty in India